David Williams was an architect and community planner.  He worked in the Washington, D.C. office of Federal Emergency Relief Administration (FERA).

Early in his professional career he worked in Tampico, Mexico for Gulf Oil as a civil engineer.  He designed a building for prefabrication that was widely used by Gulf and other oil companies.

In 1935, he met with President Franklin D. Roosevelt, who was "fascinated" with David's ideas.

A number of his works are listed on the U.S. National Register of Historic Places.

Works include:
Berry House, 5805 N. Farm Loop Rd., Palmer, Alaska (Williams, David), NRHP-listed
Bailey Colony Farm, 3150 N. Glenn Hwy., Palmer, Alaska (Williams, David), NRHP-listed
Herried House, 4400 N. Palmer-Fishook Hwy., Palmer, Alaska (Williams, David), NRHP-listed 
Matanuska Colony Community Center, roughly bounded by S. Colony, E. Firewood, S. Eklutua, E. Elmwood, S. Denali and a line N of properties on E. Dahlia, Palmer, Alaska (Williams, David), NRHP-listed 
Patten Colony Farm, Mi. 39.9 Glenn Hwy., across from State Fairground, Palmer, Alaska (Williams, David), NRHP-listed

References

American architects
Architects from Alaska
New Deal in Alaska
People of the Alaska Territory
Place of birth missing
Year of birth missing
Year of death missing